Exhibition of Evil is a Nancy Drew and Hardy Boys Supermystery crossover novel, published in 1997.

Plot summary
Williamsburg, Virginia, attracts many visitors interested in the history, traditions, and way of life of colonial America, but Nancy Drew and her friend, Bess, haven't come for that. They have arrived at Williamsburg to help Dana Somers, a stunt diver at a water park, who has received threats on her life. Meanwhile, while reenacting the famous Battle of Yorktown, the Hardy Boys witness a British friend, Colin MacDonald, die from a serious injury on the field and suspect murder. The Hardys must team up with Nancy to solve the case, and find the villain.

References

External links
Exhibition of Evil at Fantastic Fiction
Supermystery series books

Supermystery
1997 American novels
1997 children's books
Novels set in Virginia
Williamsburg, Virginia